

Countess of Berg

House of Berg, 1077–1248

House of Limburg, 1248–1384

House of Jülich, 1384–1389 
None

Duchess of Berg

House of Jülich, 1389–1511

House of La Marck, 1511–1609

House of Wittelsbach, 1614–1806

Grand Duchess of Berg and Cleves

House of Bonaparte, 1806–1813

See also
List of consorts of Cleves
List of consorts of Jülich
List of Rhenish consorts
List of Bavarian consorts

 
 
 
Berg
Berg